Berat Albayrak ( born 21 February 1978) is a Turkish businessman and former politician, and the son-in-law of Turkish president Recep Tayyip Erdoğan. He is a former CEO of Çalık Holding. He was a member of parliament from Istanbul in the 25th, 26th and 27th legislative sessions. He served as Minister of Energy and Natural Resources in the 64th and 65th government of Turkey and was the Minister of Finance and Treasury in the 66th government until his unexpected resignation on 8 November 2020 citing health reasons. His resignation was officially accepted on 9 November and he was succeeded by Lütfi Elvan on 10 November. In 2004, he married the daughter of Turkish president Erdoğan. Albayrak has been accused of involvement in oil production and smuggling in the Islamic State.

Early life
Berat Albayrak was born on 21 February 1978, the son of Sadık Albayrak, a journalist and politician, and Kıymet Albayrak.

Albayrak is a graduate of Özel Fatih Koleji (High School) in Istanbul.
He graduated from the business department of Istanbul University. He continued his education in New York City, where he earned a master's degree at Pace University's Lubin School of Business. Albayrak received a PhD degree from Kadir Has University in 2011. Albayrak received a PhD degree in the field of banking and finance with a dissertation about "Financing Renewable Energy Resources". His thesis advisor was Erişah Arıcan, who sits on the boards of the Turkey Wealth Fund and the Borsa Istanbul stock exchange. It has been alleged that she wrote his PhD thesis.

His brother Serhat also had a senior position in Çalık Holding.

Business career
Albayrak began his career in business in 1996.

Çalık Holding
In 1999, Albayrak started working for Çalık Holding, in various positions in its Turkish and foreign subsidiaries. In 2002, Albayrak became the financial director of the US office of Çalık Holding, while studying for an MBA at the Lubin School of Business, Pace University in New York City. In 2004, Albayrak was appointed as the US country manager of Çalık Holding.

Upon his return to Turkey in 2006, Albayrak first served as the assistant general manager of financial affairs in Çalık Holding. He became the CEO in 2007, and was also made director of various subsidiaries. Albayrak was CEO of Çalık Holding until late 2013.

Educational foundations 
Albayrak was the chairman of BTİ Educational Institutions, which he founded in April 2014. In October 2014, he established the Nun Education and Culture Foundation, with Serhat Albayrak and Ömer Faruk Kalyoncu.

Other activities
Albayrak gave lectures on banking and finance at Marmara University, and wrote a column for daily newspaper Sabah from 2008 until 2015.

Political career

Domestic politics
Albayrak became a Member of Parliament for the ruling Justice and Development Party (AKP) after the June 2015 Turkish general election. At the 5th Ordinary Congress of the AK Party held on September 12, 2015, Prime Minister Ahmet Davutoğlu was re-elected party leader of the AKP, while Berat Albayrak was elected to the Central Decision Executive Board (MKYK) and became part of the party's management. Albayrak was re-elected as Member of Parliament in the November 2015 Turkish general election.

Minister of Energy and Natural Resources 

On 24 November 2015, he was appointed Minister for Energy and Natural Resources in the 64th Government of Turkey under the premiership of Ahmet Davutoğlu.

Amid his tenure as Minister of Energy and Natural Resources, Turkey's medium and long-term energy policies were arranged. It was called the “National Energy and Mine Strategy Paper”. Numerous pioneering energy projects were conducted in these terms, such as putting Turkey's first floating storage and regasification unit into service, making 1000 MW of the world's largest wind and solar tender upon domestic manufacture and R&D, setting in motion Turkey's first drilling vessel, achieving a mining land drilling depth of 1 million meters and declaring the National Boron Strategy. His tenure as energy minister saw power companies run up billions of dollars in debts as they borrowed cash to fund buyouts and expansion, while government caps on energy prices also eroded their bottom lines; the energy sector is believed to have contributed to the Turkish currency and debt crisis of 2018. He was reelected on 24 June 2018 to parliament under a new constitution.

ISIL oil sale allegations

In December 2015, Albayrak had been accused by Russians and Eren Erdem, a member of the Grand National Assembly for the opposition Republican People's Party (CHP) of allegedly having links to sale of oil by the Islamic State of Iraq and the Levant through Turkey. The lawyer of Albayrak dismissed the claims saying that "the allegations are totally false and wrongly attributed.” In December 2016, WikiLeaks released over 57,000 emails, from 2000 to 2016, allegedly obtained by the Marxist–Leninist RedHack that WikiLeaks stated were from Albayrak's personal emails, and which were alleged to link Albayrak with ISIL oil smuggling. The Independent reported that the emails showed that "Albayrak had intimate knowledge of staffing and salary issues at Powertrans, a company which was controversially given a monopoly on the road and rail transportation of oil into the country from Iraqi Kurdistan", adding that "Turkish media reported in 2014 and 2015 that Powertrans has been accused of mixing in oil produced by Isis in neighbouring Syria and adding it to local shipments which eventually reached Turkey". Albayrak had previously denied that he had any connection to Powertrans. In late 2016, John R. Bass, the US Ambassador to Turkey, said that claims about a Turkish government's involvement in ISIL oil trade were unfounded, citing the official apology issued by the CIA with regards to such allegations in 2014. In April 2018, it was claimed that this Wikipedia entry on Albayrak stating the alleged oil trade with ISIS was among the four articles which led to the 2017-2020 Wikipedia ban.

Minister of Finance and Treasury 

On 9 July 2018, President Recep Tayyip Erdoğan appointed Albayrak as economic chief of his new administration, in charge of a new ministry called Finance and Treasury, fueling investor unease about competence and orthodoxy of economic policymaking, with the Turkish lira losing 3.8 percent of its value within one hour after his appointment. Consequently, Albayrak had to resign from his position as deputy as the current Turkish constitution does not allow MPs to also be ministers.

In 2020, Albayrak launched the ‘1 million software developer’ project, a campaign to train at least a million software developers in a project assisted with online courses. Albayrak announced on his official Instagram account on 8 November 2020 that he had resigned from the ministry of treasury and finance, citing his health problems and wishing to spend time with his family.

Football controversy 
In 2019, minister Albayrak was gifted with Trabzonspor's new season jersey during his visit to Trabzon. He said, “This was the jersey of the season of 2010-2011. So, did they make the jersey of the season that the team became the champion?” Albayrak's comments sparked controversy on social media, accusing him of suggesting to the 2011 Turkish football match-fixing scandal, the season where Fenerbahçe won the trophy. Fenerbahçe S.K. released a statement, saying that the 2010-2011 trophy that was won with hard work is being exhibited in Fenerbahçe's museum. Fenerbahçe fans shouted slogans during a match of Fenerbahçe, calling on Albayrak to quit his post.

Personal life
Albayrak married Esra Erdoğan in July 2004. They have four children; Ahmet Akif (b. 2006), Emine Mahinur (b. 2009), Sadık (b. 2015) and Hamza Salih (b. 2020).

With respect to the global Paradise Papers investigation, Albayrak in 2018 filed defamation lawsuits against journalist and International Consortium of Investigative Journalists member Pelin Ünker and her newspaper Cumhuriyet, not claiming factual errors or inaccuracies but seeking financial penalties for alleged damage to his reputation, after the newspaper in November 2017 published details on how politicians, multinational corporations and criminals had hidden money offshore and avoided taxes, including Albayrak-managed Çalık Holding and Albayrak's brother Serhat.

Awards 
In October 2019, the U.K.-based business magazine GlobalCapital awarded Turkey's Finance and Treasury Ministry the Public Debt Management Office of the Year, for its "successful performance in debt management albeit difficult periods".

References

External links 

 
 
 

1978 births
Businesspeople from Istanbul
Deputies of Istanbul
Erdoğan family
Istanbul University alumni
Pace University alumni
Justice and Development Party (Turkey) politicians
Living people
Members of the 26th Parliament of Turkey
Members of the 25th Parliament of Turkey
Members of the 64th government of Turkey
Members of the 65th government of Turkey
Members of the 66th government of Turkey
Ministers of Energy and Natural Resources of Turkey
Ministers of Finance of Turkey
Kadir Has University alumni